Tiarannidae is a family of cnidarians belonging to the order Leptothecata.

Genera:
 Chromatonema Fewkes, 1882
 Krampella Russell, 1957
 Margalefia Pagès, Bouillon & Gili, 1991
 Modeeria Forbes, 1848
 Stegolaria Stechow, 1913
 Stegopoma Levinsen, 1893
 Tiaranna Haeckel, 1879

References

 
Leptothecata
Cnidarian families